The 1968 Primera División season was the 77th season of top-flight football in Argentina, continuing with the Metropolitano and Nacional championships format. Tigre and Los Andes (1st and 2nd of "Torneo Reclasificatorio") promoted from Primera B.

San Lorenzo (8th league title) and Vélez Sársfield (1st title) won the Metropolitano and Nacional respectively. On the other hand, Ferro Carril Oeste and Tigre were relegated after playing a "Reclasificatorio" tournament.

Campeonato Metropolitano

Group A

Group B

Semifinals
Played under a single-match format in neutral venue:

Final

Match details

Reclasificatorio Tournament
Teams that finished 9th, 10th and 11th in both zones of Metropolitano qualified to "Torneo Reclasificación", also contested by four teams from Primera B. The ten clubs played in a double round-robin system. The first 6 teams would remain/promote to Primera División while the last four would remain/be relegated to Primera B.

The tournament ran from August 2 to December 7, and was won (not awarded as an official title) by Quilmes, with Ferro Carril Oeste and Tigre being relegated to the second division.

Promocional Tournament
Teams placed 7th and 8th in each zone of Campeonato Metropolitano, plus the four teams that had lost finals of Torneo Regional contested the "Torneo Promocional". It ran from 26 August to 30 November and was won by Banfield, with no official title awarded.

Top scorers

Campeonato Nacional

Standings

First place playoffs 
As Vélez Sársfield, River Plate, and Racing finished equaled on points, they played a round-robin tournament to define a champion. All the matches were held in San Lorenzo Stadium. Teams finished 1st and 2nd qualified for the 1969 Copa Libertadores.

Results  
 1st. Match [Dec 19]: River Plate 2–0 Racing 
 2nd. Match [Dec 22]: River Plate 1–1 Vélez Sarsfield 
 3rd. Match [Dec 29]: Racing 2–4 Vélez Sarsfield

Final table

Top scorers

References

Argentine Primera División seasons
p
p
Argentine Primera Division
1